The medial marginal vein is a continuation of the Dorsal venous arch of the foot and is the origin of the long saphenous vein.

See also
 Lateral marginal vein

References

Veins of the lower limb